Blue Streak: The Album is a soundtrack to the 1999 comedy film Blue Streak. It is composed of fourteen R&B and hip hop tracks from various artists and producers. The album peaked at number 31 on the Billboard 200 and number 9 and on the Top R&B/Hip-Hop Albums. Its lead single, "Girl's Best Friend" performed by Jay-Z, peaked at #52 on the Hot 100 and #19 on the Hot R&B/Hip-Hop Songs. So Plush's "Damn (Should've Treated U Right)" peaked at #41 on the Hot R&B/Hip-Hop Songs and #68 on the R&B/Hip-Hop Airplay.

Track listing

Personnel 

Shawn Corey Carter - performer (track 1)
Mashonda Tifrere - performer (track 1)
Kasseem Dean - producer (track 1)
Ken "Duro" Ifill - mixing (track 1)
Tyrese Darnell Gibson - performer (track 2)
Dwight Errington Myers - performer (track 2)
Steven Aaron Jordan - performer & producer (track 2)
Audrey Martells - performer (track 2)
Nicole Renée Harris - performer (track 2)
Tony Black - mixing (track 2)
Rhonda Roussel - performer (track 3)
Donielle Carter - performer (track 3)
Raquel Campbell - performer (track 3)
T. J. Lottie - performer (track 3)
Jeffrey Edward Atkins - performer (track 3)
Rodney Roy Jerkins - producer & performer (track 3), producer (track 5)
Lashawn Ameen Daniels - co-producer (track 3), performer (track 5)
Mary Yvette Brown - performer (track 3)
Jean-Marie Horvat - mixing (tracks: 3, 5)
Kelly Cherelle Price - performer (track 4)
Sue Ann Carwell - performer (track 4)
Guy Roche - producer (track 4)
Manny Marroquin - mixing (track 4)
Keith Douglas Sweat - performer (tracks: 5, 13), co-producer (track 5)
Shawntae Harris - performer (track 5)
Corey Woods - performer (track 6)
Bruce Lamar Mayfield - performer (track 6)
Brian Palmer - producer (track 6)
Sergio 'PLX' Moore - producer (track 6)
Terrance Quaites - performer (track 7)
Anthony Henderson - performer (track 7)
Jermaine Dupri Mauldin - producer (track 7)
Bryan-Michael Cox - co-producer (track 7)
Phil Tan - mixing (track 7)
Byron Otto Thomas - performer & producer (track 8)
Terius Gray - performer (track 8)
Dwayne Michael Carter, Jr. - performer (track 8)
Bryan Christopher Williams - performer (track 8)
Christopher Noel Dorsey - performer (track 8)
Tab Virgil Jr. - performer (track 8)
Pat Viala - mixing (track 8)
Inga DeCarlo Fung Marchand - performer (track 9)
Kenya "Fame Flames" Miller - producer (track 9)
Tamir Ruffin - producer (tracks: 9, 12), performer (track 12)
Tony Smalios - mixing (track 9)
Jason Brooks Buford - performer (track 10)
Danny Alexander - performer (track 10)
Gary "Gizzo" Smith - producer (track 10)
Albert Van Bryant - performer & producer (track 11)
Jamal Ali Nash - producer (track 11)
Brett Stewart - mixing (track 11)
Dante Jordan - performer (track 12)
David Chance - performer (track 12)
Rufus Waller - performer (track 12)
Marinna Teal - performer (tracks: 12, 13)
Phil Weatherspoon - co-producer (track 12)
Axel Niehaus - mixing (track 12)
Steve 'Stone' Huff - producer (track 13)
Karl Heilbron - mixing (track 13)
Stephen Ellis Garrett - performer & producer (track 14)
Benjamin Bush - performer (track 14)
Mikael Ifversen - mixing (track 14)
David Earl McPherson II - executive producer
Ken Ross - executive producer
Neal H. Moritz - executive producer
Kenyatta "Tally" Galbreth - associative executive producer
Neil Kellerhouse - design
David Daoud Coleman - art direction

Singles Chart Positions

References

1999 soundtrack albums
Hip hop soundtracks
Epic Records soundtracks
Albums produced by Stevie J
Albums produced by Guy Roche
Rhythm and blues soundtracks
Albums produced by Swizz Beatz
Albums produced by Keith Sweat
Albums produced by Mannie Fresh
Albums produced by Rodney Jerkins
Albums produced by Jermaine Dupri
Albums produced by Bryan-Michael Cox
Comedy film soundtracks